The 1990 Brazilian Grand Prix was a Formula One motor race held at Interlagos, São Paulo on 25 March 1990. It was the second race of the 1990 Formula One World Championship. It was also the first Brazilian Grand Prix to be held at Interlagos since 1980, following the renovation and shortening of the circuit and the ascendancy of São Paulo driver Ayrton Senna.

The 71-lap race was won by Alain Prost, driving a Ferrari. Senna took pole position in his McLaren-Honda and led until he collided with Satoru Nakajima in the Tyrrell-Ford, allowing Prost through. Prost took his 40th Grand Prix victory, and his sixth and final Brazilian win, with Senna's teammate Gerhard Berger second and Senna himself recovering to third.

Background
The rebuilt Interlagos circuit, which hosted the race for the first time since 1980, had been dramatically altered. The track had been shortened by 3.5 km and lost many fast sweepers and the Retao straight, which had allowed Formula One drivers to use full throttle for 20 seconds.

Qualifying

Pre-qualifying report
In the Friday morning pre-qualifying session, the Larrousse-Lola cars secured a 1–2, with Éric Bernard a couple of tenths of a second faster than his team-mate Aguri Suzuki. Five thousandths of a second behind Suzuki in third was Olivier Grouillard in the Osella. The other pre-qualifier was Yannick Dalmas in his AGS, the first time the Frenchman had progressed to the main qualifying sessions this season. Dalmas edged out his team-mate Gabriele Tarquini, who was fifth, the fastest runner to drop out at this stage.

Roberto Moreno also missed out in sixth in an eventful session. His EuroBrun suffered an ignition problem just 200 metres after leaving the pitlane and the team decided to let Moreno use the car of his team-mate Claudio Langes, who at that stage had the sixth best time. Moreno promised Langes he would return the car for the last 10 minutes of the session. Moreno managed a fast lap that placed him at the top of the pre-qualifying table at that point, with a time of 1:25.763. But as he attempted a second fast lap straight afterwards, the car stopped on the track, because the team had miscalculated the fuel quantity needed for two fast laps and the EuroBrun ran out of fuel. Moreno's hope of progressing to qualifying proper ended as the track dried up, and in the final minutes of the session he was bumped down to sixth place. Langes never got back in the car, and was ultimately thirteen seconds adrift of Moreno's time in eighth place.

Bertrand Gachot struggled badly again in the Coloni, faster than Langes but still ten seconds off Bernard's pace in seventh. The Coloni's Subaru 1235 engine, built by Motori Moderni, was proving to be overweight, underpowered and fragile. Bottom of the time sheets was Gary Brabham in the Life, failing to post a time at all. The car's engine broke a connecting rod after a quarter of a lap, leaving Brabham and his manager to question the Australian's future at the team. Brabham later stated that he had been uncertain his team would even be present at Interlagos, until he saw the car in the pit garage.

Pre-qualifying classification

Qualifying report
Local hero Ayrton Senna took his 43rd career pole position and led from the start. Gianni Morbidelli made it through qualifying for the first time in his Formula One career.

Qualifying classification

Race

Race report
After qualifying, Williams driver Thierry Boutsen, himself third on the grid, predicted that the Ferraris on the third row of the grid would be the cars to beat, citing their semi-automatic transmission and its paddle shift which allowed both Alain Prost and Nigel Mansell to keep their hands on the wheel around the bumpy turns at the back of the circuit

At the first corner, Jean Alesi, Alessandro Nannini and Andrea de Cesaris tangled, eliminating de Cesaris and requiring the Benetton driver to stop for a new nosecone. On lap eight Boutsen passed Berger for second place, and Prost took the V12 Ferrari past the McLaren driver on lap 17. Mansell pitted on lap 27 for new tyres and also to inspect a broken rollbar, rejoining in 9th place.
Boutsen's pit stop on lap 30 went disastrously wrong. With failing brakes, and a tricky bump in the pitlane, the Williams was unable to stop and crashed into some of his mechanics and the wheel and tyre equipment stacked outside the garage. This required a new nosecone and when he rejoined, he was down in 11th position.

Prost was piling on the pressure, and by lap 35 he had climbed to second within 10 seconds of Senna, and was now ahead of Riccardo Patrese, Berger and Nelson Piquet. When Senna came up to lap former Lotus teammate Satoru Nakajima, there was contact and the McLaren had to pit for a new nosecone. He rejoined and challenged hard, but the reduced downforce levels made the car difficult to drive. On lap 66, Patrese retired with a broken oil cooler.

Prost took his 40th victory, and his first for Ferrari, from Berger and the recovering Senna. Mansell finished an excellent fourth, having driven through the field with a broken rollbar. Boutsen finished a creditable fifth and Piquet claimed the final point in front of his home crowd after passing Alesi – who was suffering severe tyre wear after attempting to run non-stop on his Pirellis – on the last lap.

Race classification

Championship standings after the race

Drivers' Championship standings

Constructors' Championship standings

 Note: Only the top five positions are included for both sets of standings.

References

Brazilian Grand Prix
Brazilian Grand Prix
Grand Prix
Brazilian Grand Prix